Willie Monroe Jr. (born December 17, 1986) is an American professional boxer. He has challenged twice for a world title; first in 2015 for the WBA (Super), interim WBC, and IBO middleweight titles. In 2017, he challenged for the WBO middleweight title.

Amateur career
Monroe's amateur record was 128–14, he won gold at the Empire Games and in the New York Golden Gloves.

Professional career
Monroe made his debut on March 27, 2008 against Erix Quinteros. After winning his first 10 fights, his first loss came against Darnell Boone in 2011. After the loss he was released by his promoter. After 17 months without a fight, Monroe returned to the ring in August 2012. In 2014 he won the Boxcino Tournament which aired on ESPN 2. On January 16, 2015 he defeated Brian Vera in a 10-round unanimous decision.

Monroe Jr vs. Golovkin 

Monroe fought against undefeated Gennady Golovkin on May 16, 2015. He lost the fight with a sixth round TKO.

Monroe Jr vs. Saunders 

On September 16, 2017, Monroe Jr challenged Billy Joe Saunders for his WBO middleweight title but ultimately suffered the third defeat of his career, via a unanimous decision.

Monroe Jr vs. Maciel 
On 24 August, 2018, Monroe Jr fought and defeated Javier Francisco Maciel via unanimous decision, winning 100-90, 100-90 and 99-91 on the scorecards.

Monroe Jr vs. Centeno Jr 
In his next bout, Monroe Jr faced the WBC #14 at middleweight Hugo Centeno Jr. In a largely slow and actionless fight, Monroe Jr managed to come out with a unanimous decision victory, 98-92, 97-93 and 96-94 on the scorecards.

Professional boxing record

References

External links 
 
Willie Monroe Jr - Profile, News Archive & Current Rankings at Box.Live

1986 births
Living people
Sportspeople from Rochester, New York
Boxers from New York (state)
African-American boxers
American male boxers
Middleweight boxers
Southpaw boxers